The Argentine Air Force (or simply FAA) is the air force of Argentina and branch of the Armed Forces of the Argentine Republic. In 2018, it had 13,837 military and 6,900 civilian personnel.

History

The Air Force's history began with the establishment of the Army Aviation Service's Escuela de Aviación Militar ('Military Aviation School') on 10 August 1912.

Interwar period 

Throughout the years following World War I, the predecessor to the Argentine Air Force received various aircraft from France and Italy. In 1922, the Escuela Militar de Aviación was temporarily disbanded, resulting in the formation of Grupo 1 de Aviación ('Aviation Group One') as an operational unit. During 1925, the Escuela Militar de Aviación was reopened, and the Grupo 3 de Observación ('Observation Group Three') created, with Grupo 1 de Aviación becoming known as Grupo 1 de Observación shortly after.

In that same year, the Fábrica Militar de Aviones (lit. 'Military Aircraft Factory', FMA), which would play a crucial role in the country's aviation industry, was founded in Córdoba. Despite that, throughout the 1930s, Argentina acquired various aircraft from the United Kingdom, Germany, and the United States.

By 1938–39, Argentina's air power consisted of roughly 3,200 personnel (including about 200 officers) and maintained approximately 230 aircraft. Roughly 150 of these were operated by the army and included Dewoitine D.21 and Curtiss P-36 Hawk fighters; Breguet 19 reconnaissance planes; Northrop A-17 and Martin B-10 bombers, North American NA-16 trainers, Focke-Wulf Fw 58 multi-role planes, Junkers Ju 52 transports, and Fairchild 82s. Approximately 80 out of the 230 aircraft present were operated by the navy and included the Supermarine Southampton, Supermarine Walrus, Fairey Seal, Fairey III, Vought O2U Corsair, Consolidated P2Y, Curtiss T-32 Condor II, Douglas Dolphin, and Grumman J2F Duck.

World War II and Immediate Post-War 
The first step towards establishing the Air Force as a separate branch of the Armed Forces was taken during the 11th of February 1944 to establish the Aeronautical Command-in-Chief (Comando en Jefe de Aeronáutica) directly under the mandate of the Department of War.

At the end of World War II, the Air Force began a process of modernization. This 'golden age' (roughly 1945–1955) was ushered in by the availability of foreign currency in Argentina, an abundance of now-unemployed aerospace engineers from Germany, Italy, and France, and the British provision of latest-generation engines alongside other aircraft parts. In his first term, President Juan Perón brought teams of European engineers to the FMA, then known as the Instituto Aerotécnico ('Aerotechnical Institute'), or I.Ae., to promote aircraft technological development. The count totaled to around 750 workers, including two teams of German designers (led by Kurt Tank) and the French engineer Émile Dewoitine.

In 1947, the Air Force purchased 100 Gloster Meteor jet fighters. These aircraft were paid for by the United States to partially pay back its debt to Argentina, which had provided them with raw materials during World War II. This purchase caused the Argentine Air Force to become the first in Latin America equipped with jet-propelled combat fighters. In addition, several Avro Lincoln and Avro Lancaster bombers were also acquired.

The Air Force, with former Luftwaffe officers as consultants and with the European teams that Perón had brought, also began to develop its own aircraft, including the I.Ae. 27 Pulqui I and the I.Ae. 33 Pulqui II jet fighter prototypes. These manufactures gave Argentina the positions of the first country in Latin America and the sixth in the world to develop jet fighter technology on its own. Other Argentina-developed aircraft included the prototypes the  trainer, the bi-motor fighter I.Ae. 30 Ñancú, and the assault glider I.Ae. 25 Mañque; and the production twin-engine I.Ae. 35 Huanquero transport, the I. Ae 22 DL advanced trainer, and the I.Ae 24 Calquín twin-engine attack-bomber; as well as rockets, and planes for civilian use (like the FMA 20 El Boyero).

Cold War Period

The Revolución Libertadora (1955) 
The Argentine Air Force came into active operation for the first time on June 16, 1955 during the bombing of the Plaza de Mayo in Buenos Aires. Government loyalist Gloster Meteors fought rebel planes and attempted a failed assassination of the President in a coup d'état. The plan failed, and the rebels bombed the city and the House of Government). In the following September coup, the Air Force supported Perón's government by initiating combat operations and transporting troops and arms with a meager five aircraft defecting to the other side. After the Revolución Libertadora succeeded and the coup took place, previously mentioned manufacturing operations ceased and most foreign workers left the country, including engineer Kurt Tank who went to work in India. Despite claims that the Argentine Air Force "baptisme by fire" took place during the Malvinas War (1982), this was actually the first time it entered combat.

Antarctic Support 
During 1952, the Air Force started supplying the Antarctic scientific bases using ski-equipped Douglas C-47s. Previously, President Juan Perón had created the Antarctic Task Forces (FATA, Fuerzas de Tareas Antárticas) to fulfill this purpose. In 1970, the Air Force began operating C-130 Hercules aircraft into Antarctica. The Fokker F-28 Fellowship presidential aircraft is reported to be the first jet to have landed there, in 1973. Since the 1970s, DHC-6 Twin Otters have also been deployed, with the Air Force launching Operation Transantar on October 1973.  This resulted in the first trans-Antarctic three-continent flight in history when a Hercules C-130 flew between Río Gallegos; Marambio Base; Christchurch, New Zealand and Canberra, Australia.

Modernization (1960s–1970s) 

In the 1960s, new aircraft were incorporated, including the F-86F Sabre jet fighter and the Douglas A-4 Skyhawk mainly used for ground-attack. During the 1970s, the Air Force re-equipped itself with Mirage III interceptors, IAI Dagger multi-role fighters, and C-130 Hercules cargo planes. A counter-insurgency airplane, the Pucará, was also manufactured and used in substantial numbers. The Air Force also had an important role in the 1976 coup which lead to a military dictatorship that lasted until 1983.

Falklands War (1982) 

The Falklands War was the first war fought by the Argentine Air Force against an external enemy. Some operational aircraft were obsolete. However, the airforce came close to winning the war for Argentina. During the war, the Air Force division of the Military Junta was called the Fuerza Aérea Sur (FAS, 'Southern Air Force'), and led by Ernesto Crespo.

Air engagements began on May 1, 1982 with the UK's Royal Air Force initiating Operation Black Buck, in which the Avro Vulcan bomber XM607 attacked military air bases on the islands. The Task Force then sent Sea Harriers to attack positions at Stanley and Goose Green, where the first Argentine casualties occurred.

The Argentine Air Force reacted by sending multiple IAI Dagger, A-4 Skyhawk attack aircraft, and Mirage III interceptors into the fray. The Mirage III went into combat with the Harriers on Bourbon Island, with one Mirage lost to a Harrier. On May 21, the Battle of San Carlos ("Bomb Alley") began once the Air Force attacked a detachment of British ships involved in the landing in the San Carlos Water. The Dagger and Skyhawk aircraft sank three British ships (HMS Coventry, a Type 42 destroyer; and two frigates, HMS Antelope and HMS Ardent).

On June 8, the Air Force carried out an operation in Bluff Cove. The British were using the landing ships RFA Sir Galahad and RFA Sir Tristram to position the 5th Infantry Brigade for an assault on Port Stanley. As these ships were unloading and therefore vulnerable, they were attacked by nine A-4 Skyhawks in two waves, while five Daggers attacked the escorting frigate  and four more conducted a decoy mission over the north of the islands to draw off British Sea Harriers. The Skyhawks destroyed the landing craft "Foxtrot 4", damaged the Sir Galahad so badly that it was subsequently scuttled and also severely damaged the Sir Tristram, although she survived and was later rebuilt. Fire and explosions on the ships resulted in 56 deaths and 150 wounded; the worst single loss of life for the British in the war. After their attack, three A-4s from the second wave were shot down by Sea Harriers, killing all three pilots. All the explosive ordinance deployed by the Daggers failed to explode.

On June 13, the A-4 Skyhawks of the Argentinian Air Force renewed their attacks in two formations of four aircraft each and launched an attack against enemy troops and helicopters. On June 14, 1982, the Argentine command surrendered, returning control of the Falklands, Georgia, and the South Sandwich Islands to the United Kingdom. The Argentine Air Force suffered 55 dead and 47 wounded, with 505 combat departures and 62 aircraft losses, as listed below:

 19 A-4 Skyhawk
 2 Mirage III
 11 Dagger
 2 Canberra
 24 IA-58 Pucará
 1 C-130H Hercules
 1 Learjet 35
 2 Bell 212

Post-war (1983–2003) 

After the war, the UK imposed an arms embargo on Argentina. The United States, however, sold Argentina 36 A-4AR Fighting hawks, a refurbished and upgraded version of the A-4 Skyhawks. Other equipment purchased by Argentina were: 23 US Army surplus OV-1 Mohawks, 22 Ex-Israeli IAI Dagger, 2 C-130B, and 1 Lockheed L-100-30. 

Argentina started the development of brand new aircraft, including the FMA IA-63 Pampa, the combat fighter FMA SAIA 90, and the subsequent transformation of the Condor missile into a medium-range ballistic missile. Of these, only the Pampa was successfully developed.

During 1994, Menem discontinued mandatory military service and began allowing women to serve.

Support to UN peacekeeping missions  
The Argentine Air Force has been involved in United Nations peacekeeping missions, sending a contingent to Cyprus in 1994 and deploying Bell 212 helicopters to Haiti during 2005.

Early 21st Century 
In early 2005, seventeen brigadiers, including the Chief of Staff, Brigadier General Carlos Rohde, were fired by President Néstor Kirchner following a scandal involving drug trafficking through Ezeiza International Airport. Kirchner cited failures in the security systems of the Argentine airports, which were overseen by the National Aeronautic Police, then a branch of the Air Force (predecessor of the today independent Airport Security Police), and cover-ups of the scandal.

2010s 
, budgetary constraints continued, leading to the disbanding of the Boeing 707 transport squadron and maintenance problems for half of the C-130 Hercules fleet.

In August 2010, a contract was signed for two Mi-17E helicopters, plus an option on a further three, to support Antarctic bases.

The FAA has been seeking to replace its ageing force with more capable and more serviceable modern aircraft. The acquisition of Spanish Mirage F1Ms, IAI Kfir Block 60s and Saab Gripen E/Fs were considered, but as of February 2015, all of those deals appear to have stalled; the Mirage F1 deal was scrapped by the Spanish government in March 2014, after pressure from the UK to not assist in FAA modernization over tensions between the countries over the Falkland Islands. The UK has also managed to veto the sale of Gripen E/Fs, as 30% of the Gripen's parts are manufactured there. The deal with Israel has reportedly stalled for technical and political reasons. China has allegedly offered JF-17/FC-1's and Chengdu J-10's to Argentina. The two countries have formed a working group to look into the transfer of 14 aircraft. Russia had also offered to lease 12 Su-24 strike aircraft to the FAA, but Jane's reported that the Su-24 would not be very useful to the FAA and that "it would appear that any proposed transfer of such aircraft is likely the result of Russia playing political games with the UK over the continuing crisis in Ukraine." All Mirages were officially decommissioned on 30 November 2015. The A-4s were grounded , for lack of spares; in any case only 4–5 were airworthy with the rest in storage at Villa Reynolds. When Barack Obama visited in March 2016, Air Force One was accompanied by US Air Force F-16s because Argentina could only offer Pucarás and Pampas for air defense.

As of July 2019, the Argentine Air Force and government selected the KAI FA-50 as its interim fighter. With this act being the first step in modernizing the fighter force and replacing the Mirage 3, Dagger, and Mirage 5 fighters that have also been retired; it was also anticipated that obtaining FA-50 would help mitigate the retirement of the Martin A-4AR Fightinghawk fleet, as they were ageing and becoming difficult to maintain. As of 2020, it is reported that as few as six of the Fightinghawk aircraft remain operational. While no specific numbers of aircraft to purchase were given, the media reported that up to 10 FA-50s were considered. Despite elections coming in October 2019, the deal had been expected to go through. An Argentine delegation first visited the Republic of Korea Air Force in September 2016. At that time an FAA pilot was able to test fly the TA-50 Golden Eagle operational trainer variant of the FA-50.

However, the deal appeared to have been canceled in early 2020, leaving the Air Force without a fighter replacement. Some sources suggested that the cancellation was due to the financial pressures resulting from the COVID-19 pandemic, while others reported that British intervention played a part by preventing the export of an aircraft incorporating various British components. In October 2020, Korea Aerospace Industries (KAI) confirmed that since major components of the aircraft were supplied by the U.K., the aircraft could not be exported to Argentina. Britain similarly blocked the potential sale of Brazilian license-built Saab Gripen aircraft to Argentina, given that some avionics were of British origin. Argentina was now said to be exploring the potential acquisition of aircraft from Russia, China, India  or Pakistan. However, even sales of Chinese aircraft reportedly encountered potential problems since the ejector seats of the aircraft were the MK6, manufactured by Martin-Baker in the UK.

2020s 

Early in 2021, Russia made several proposals related to the acquisition of aircraft by Argentina including the apparent offer of MiG-35 fighters. These built on earlier offers of the MiG-29 as well as on measures being undertaken to extend the life of Mi-171E helicopters acquired by Argentina in 2010 to support operations in Antarctica.

To improve transport capabilities, two Fokker F-28 aircraft which had been decommissioned in 2019, have been refurbished and put into service, the last one (TC-53) in early August 2021.

In mid 2021, one analysis found that the numbers of operational aircraft with offensive combat capability were practically at a level of zero. In addition to only around six A-4 Fightinghawk aircraft being operational, the availability of C-130 transport aircraft was only assessed as being at 6 of originally 14 aircraft. However, 23 IA-63 Pampa, 12 T-6C+ Texan II and 12 EMB-312 Tucano trainer aircraft were reported operational as of 2021. In September 2021, the Government officially included funding of $664 million in a draft budget for Congress involving the purchase of new combat aircraft. However, in December 2022, Argentine President Alberto Fernández appeared to reject the notion of buying new fighter aircraft for air force, stating: “There are other priorities before buying weapons, definitely”. Referring to the strategic and political situation in South America he further commented that: “There are no war problems, peace is the common denominator between us.” It was simultaneously confirmed that the fighter aircraft replacement program had been stopped.

2023 

Argentina has confirmed the purchase of 6 Bell 407 for the Armed Forces and  plans for the modernization of its inventory of Hughes 500Ds pending the arrival of new Beechcraft TC-12B Hurons.

Organization

The Argentine Air Force (FAA) is one of the three branches of the Argentine military, having equal status with the Army and the Navy; the President of Argentina is Commander-in-Chief of all three.

The FAA is headed by the Chief of the General Staff, directly appointed by the President. The Chief of Staff usually holds the rank of Brigadier General, the highest rank of the Air Force, being seconded by the Deputy Chief of the General Staff and three senior officers in charge of the FAA's three Commands: the Air Operations, the Personnel, and the Materiel Command.

The Air Operations Command is the branch of the Air Force responsible for aerospace defense, air operations, planning, training, and technical and logistical support of the air units. Subordinate to the Air Operations Command are the Air Brigades, the Air Force's major operative units, as well as the airspace surveillance and control group (Grupo VYCEA, Argentine Air Force). There is currently estimated to be a total of eight air brigades operational. Brigades are headquartered at Military Air Bases ( (BAMs).

Each Air Brigade is made up of three Groups, each bearing the same number as their mother Brigade. These groups include:
One Air Group, which operates the aircraft assigned to the Brigade. The Air Group is divided into a variable number of Air Squadrons. Air Groups may be named according to their primary mission, for example, an air group specialized in fighter operations receives the designation of Fighter Group (Grupo de Caza). Currently,  the Air Force includes three Fighter Groups (4th, 5th, and 6th), one Attack Group (3rd), one Transport Group (1st), and three plain Air Groups (2nd, 7th, and 9th). The 7th Air Group operates all the helicopters of the Air Force, while the 2nd includes a small reconnaissance unit as well as light transport aircraft. 9th Air Group is a light transport unit.
One Technical Group, in charge of the maintenance and repair of the Brigade's aircraft.
One Base Group, responsible for the airbase itself, weather forecasting, flight control, runway maintenance, etc. Base Groups also include Base Flights, generally made up of two or three liaison aircraft.

The Personnel Command is responsible for the training, education, assignment, and welfare of Air Force personnel. Under the control of the Personnel Command are the Military Aviation School (which educates the future officers of the Air Force), the Air Force Non-Commissioned Officer (NCO) School, and other educational and training units.

The Materiel Command deals with planning and executing the Air Force's logistics regarding flying and ground materiel. Materiel Command includes "Quilmes" and "Río Cuarto" Material Areas (repairing and maintenance units) and "El Palomar" Logistical Area.

Order of Battle

1st Air Brigade (El Palomar Military Air Base, Buenos Aires Province) in El Palomar Airport
 1st Air Transport Squadron (C-130H Hercules; KC-130H Hercules; L-100-30 Hercules)
 2nd Air Transport Squadron (Fokker F-28; partially used for state-run internal commercial flights as of 2021)
 5th Squadron (Boeing 707 retired)
2nd Air Brigade (Paraná Military Air Base, Entre Ríos Province) in General Justo José de Urquiza Airport
 2nd Reconnaissance Squadron (Learjet 35A)
 4th Squadron (Fokker F27-400M retired)
 Services Squadron (Cessna 182)
3rd Air Brigade (Reconquista Military Air Base, Santa Fe Province) in Daniel Jukic Airport
 Services Squadron (Cessna 182)
 14th Antiaircraft Artillery Battery (Oerlikon GAI-D01; Elta EL/M-2106)
4th Air Brigade (El Plumerillo Military Air Base, Mendoza Province) in Governor Francisco Gabrielli International Airport

 1st Training Squadron (FMA IA-63 Pampa serie 2)
 3rd Search and Rescue Squadron (SA-315B Lama)
 4th Cruz del Sur Aerobatics Squadron (Su-29 retired)
 Fighter School
 4th Antiaircraft Artillery Battery (Oerlikon GAI-D01; Elta EL/M-2106)
 West Tactical Intelligence Squadron
5th Air Brigade (Villa Reynolds Military Air Base, San Luis Province) in Villa Reynolds Airport 

 1st Fighter-Bomber Squadron (A-4AR Fightinghawk) 
 2nd Fighter-Bomber Squadron (A-4AR Fightinghawk) (Operational availability of Fightinghawk fleet reported in 2022 at perhaps 15-20% of 23 aircraft)
 Services Squadron (Cessna 182; Hughes 500D)
 5th Antiaircraft Artillery Battery (Rheinmetall RH 202; Elta EL/M-2106)
 6th Air Brigade (Tandil Military Air Base, Buenos Aires Province) in Tandil Airport
 1st Fighter-Bomber Squadron (AMD Mirage 5P Mara retired)
 2nd Fighter-Bomber Squadron (IAI Finger retired)
 3rd Air Interceptor Squadron (AMD Mirage IIIEA/DA retired)
 Grupo 6 de Caza (IA-63 Pampa II/III) (reported to upgrade to IA-63 Pampa III as of 2023)
 Services Squadron (Cessna 182; Aerocommander 500)
 13th Antiaircraft Artillery Battery (Oerlikon GAI-B01)
7th Air Brigade (Moreno Military Air Base, Buenos Aires Province) in Mariano Moreno Airport
 1st Search and Rescue Squadron (Bell 212; Bell 412EP)
 2nd Tactical Squadron (Hughes 500D)
 3rd Squadron (Mil Mi-171E) 
 Special Operations Group
9th Air Brigade (Comodoro Rivadavia Military Air Base, Chubut Province) in General Enrique Mosconi International Airport
 6th Air Transport Squadron (SAAB 340B)
 7th Air Transport Squadron (DHC-6 Twin Otter)
 7th Antiaircraft Artillery Battery (Rheinmetall RH 202)
 South Tactical Intelligence Squadron
Morón Military Air Base (Buenos Aires Province) in Morón Airport
 Unknown Squadron (Piper PA-34-220T Seneca; Piper/Chincul PA-28RT-201 Arrow; Piper PA-28-236 Dakota; Cessna 182)
Mar del Plata Military Air Base (Buenos Aires Province) in Astor Piazzolla International Airport
 Unknown Squadron (Roland II; Rheinmetall RH 202; Oerlikon GAI-D01; Oerlikon GDF-002; Skyguard)
 Antiaircraft Weapons Maintenance Squadron (UAV Pegasus; UAV Tehuelche; UAV Murciélago)
Río Gallegos Military Air Base (Santa Cruz Province) (X Brigade) in Piloto Civil Norberto Fernández International Airport reported equipping with 3 IA-63 Pampa III as of 2023 (re-deployed from 6 Brigade)
 Unknown Radar Squadron (AN/TPS-43; may have re-equipped with RPA-170M Air Surveillance and Control radar (medium range 3D tactical air defence radar) deployed to monitor the South Atlantic region as of 2022)
 6th Antiaircraft Artillery Battery
Military Aviation School (Cordoba, Córdoba Province)
 Glider Flight
 Services Squadron
 School Air Squadron (Grob G 120TP; Embraer EMB-312 Tucano; T-6C Texan II}

Ranks

Commissioned officer ranks
The rank insignia of commissioned officers.

Other ranks
The rank insignia of non-commissioned officers and enlisted personnel.

Aircraft

Current inventory

Chiefs of the Argentine Air Force

See also

Argentine Military – Other Air Services
Argentine Army
Argentine Army Aviation
Argentine Navy
Argentine Naval Aviation
Military of Argentina

Operational Use
Argentine air forces in the Falklands War
 Battle of San Carlos

Units and Related Organisations
Agrupación Aérea Presidencial – Presidential VIP fleet
Argentine Air Force Mobile Field Hospital
LADE – State government airline

Former aircraft 

 List of aircraft of the Argentine Air Force

References

Citations

Sources

Further reading 

  La Argentina fabricante de Aviones (retrieved 2016-04-23)

External links

  
 Organization and equipment 
 List of websites

 
Military units and formations established in 1945